The International School of Monaco (ISM) is an independent, co-educational, not-for-profit day school located on Port Hercule in Monaco. Founded in 1994 and composed of the Early Years School, Primary School, and Secondary School, ISM has over 700 students aged 3 to 18 years old, drawn from over 50 nationalities.

ISM offers a bilingual education in English and French for students in the Early Years and Primary Schools (Kindergarten to Year 6). From Year 7 onwards, the Secondary School offers a programme taught in English, leading to internationally-recognised academic qualifications. The University of Cambridge International General Certificate of Secondary Education (IGCSE) examinations are offered at the end of Year 11, following a two-year course of study. The International Baccalaureate Diploma Programme (IBDP) examinations are offered at the end of Year 13, following a two-year course of study. The school offers both the IBDP and, since September 2020, the IBCP (International Baccalaureate Career-related Programme). 

Based on the IB results from its 2021 graduating cohort, ISM was ranked in the top three IB schools in the EU / EEA by ib-schools.com. The Spear's School Index 2021, in partnership with global education group Carfax Education, ranked ISM in the top 5 best private schools in Europe (not including Switzerland and the UK).

References

External links
International School of Monaco website
ISM school profile in IB World Schools Yearbook

Schools in Monaco
International schools in Europe